The FM H-20-44 was a diesel locomotive manufactured by Fairbanks-Morse from June 1947 – March 1954. It represented the company's first foray into the road switcher market. The , ten-cylinder opposed piston engine locomotive was referred to by F-M's engineering department as the "Heavy Duty" unit. It was configured in a B-B wheel arrangement mounted atop a pair of two-axle AAR Type-B road trucks with all axles powered. H-20-44s shared the same platform and much of the same carbody as the lighter-duty FM H-15-44, which began its production run three months later.

In the same manner as other F-M switcher models, the H-20-44 started out displaying a variety of Raymond Loewy-inspired contours, only to have the majority of these superfluous trim features stripped from the last few units built as a cost-cutting measure. Only 96 units were built for American railroads, as few firms saw sufficient value in moving freight in greater quantities or at a higher speeds than was possible with the typical 1,500 and  four-axle road switchers of the era. Also limiting the model's utility as a true road unit was its lack of a short hood, which the (ironically) lighter-duty H-15-44 did have. Three intact examples of the H-20-44 are known to survive today; all are the property of railroad museums.

A six axle version for better traction was catalogued, but no orders were placed, and no demos were built.

Units produced

References

Further reading

External links
 Fairbanks-Morse H20-44 Roster
 Preserved Fairbanks Morse Four-Axle Road Switchers
 PSRMA's History of UP 1369 — photo and short history of the second unit built, one of the three surviving FM H-20-44s.

B-B locomotives
H-20-44
Diesel-electric locomotives of the United States
Railway locomotives introduced in 1947
Standard gauge locomotives of the United States